The European Severe Storms Laboratory (ESSL) is a scientific organisation that conducts research on severe convective storms, tornadoes, intense precipitation events, and avalanches across Europe and the Mediterranean. It operates the widely consulted European Severe Weather Database (ESWD).

History and purpose of the ESSL 
The European Severe Storms Laboratory started as an informal network of European scientists with the goal to advance research on severe convective storms and extreme weather events on a European level. It was initiated in 2002 by Nikolai Dotzek and became a non-profit organization with charitable status in 2006.

The ESSL focuses on research questions concerning convective storms and other extreme weather phenomena which can be treated more efficiently on a pan-European scale. It can be seen as roughly the European counterpart to the US's National Severe Storms Laboratory (NSSL). Some members of ESSL participate in the European Storm Forecast Experiment (ESTOFEX) which issues daily forecasts of severe convective storms. It can be seen as the operational counterpart to the US Storm Prediction Center (SPC) akin to ESSL being the research counterpart to NSSL, although both European organizations currently lack the institutional support enjoyed by the US organisations which are government entities.

The statutory purposes of the ESSL are:
 to advance research on severe convective storms and extreme weather events on a European level
 to operate and extend the European Severe Weather Database (ESWD)
 to support or organize the European Conferences on Severe Storms

European Severe Weather Database 
The European Severe Weather Database (ESWD) collects and verifies reports on dust, sand- or steam devils, tornadoes, gustnadoes, large hail, heavy rain and snowfall, severe wind gusts, damaging lightning strikes and avalanches all over Europe and around the Mediterranean. The ESWD is the most important database for such events in Europe. Everyone is welcome to report extreme weather observations. Each report undergoes a quality control and each event is flagged either as received (QC0), plausibility checked (QC0+), report confirmed by other observer (QC1) or as fully verified by trusted source (QC2).

European Conference on Severe Storms 
The European Conference on Severe Storms (ECSS) is a conference series organized by the ESSL since 2002 and taking place biannually. During the ECSS two prices are offered:
 The Heino-Tooming-Award is named after the meteorologist Heino Tooming († 2004) and awards excellent scientific work on severe storms in European collaborations.
 The Nikolai Dotzek Award is named after meteorologist Nikolai Dotzek and honors distinguished scientific individual performance or lifetime achievement.

Automatic Severe Weather Prediction (AR-CHARMO)
On july 27, 2022, ESSL launched a site with experimental forecasts of lightning and hail for Europe based on post-processed weather model data.

Organisation 
The ESSL has two headquarters, one in Weßling close to Munich in Germany, and the other Wiener Neustadt in Austria. Both the German and the Austrian branch work together closely as formulated in a Memorandum of Understanding in 2012, the management boards are nearly identical.

Institutional members of the general assembly are national weather services such as the German DWD and the ZAMG, as well as meteorological research institutes like  Research Center for Environmental Changes of the  Academia Sinica in Taiwan or the German Aerospace Center’s Institute of Planetary Research DLR. Other members of the general assembly are scientists interested in severe weather research from all over the world.

See also 
 Skywarn Europe
 TORRO

References

External links 
 European Severe Storms Laboratory's website
 European Severe Weather Database
 European Conference on Severe Storms
 TorDACH

Meteorological research institutes
2006 establishments in Europe
Storm
Storm chasing
Weather forecasting